Vinci is a board game designed by Philippe Keyaerts.  It resembles a diceless variant of Risk with variable special abilities and an original decline mechanic, and is also similar in some ways to History of the World. The game's name means "to be conquered" in Latin.  In 2009, the game's mechanics were re-implemented with several changes and a  fantasy-oriented theme as Small World, also credited to Keyaerts, and published by Days of Wonder.

Game play
Each player begins the game by selecting one of several available civilizations.  Each civilization is defined by two tokens, each offering a special ability or special scoring opportunity.  Each token also provides the civilization with a number of playing "pawns", to which an extra number is added based on the number of players in the game.

The player then makes use of these pawns to capture territory.  This is done in a diceless manner: to capture a territory, a player must place a particular number of pawns in it, based on the location of the territory, the number of defending pawns, and any special abilities of the player's civilization.  If the player can place a sufficient number of pawns, the capture is guaranteed to succeed; if they cannot, the move is illegal.  If enemy pawns are defeated in a captured territory, one of them is removed from the game entirely and the remainder are returned to the owning player to replace in their own territories.  At the end of each turn, a player scores points based on the number of territories they own, with some civilization abilities providing bonuses.

Since the number of pawns in a civilization is (usually) fixed, and can only go down as other civilizations capture territories, eventually a civilization will reach a maximum number of territories that it can support.  At the beginning of any turn, the player owning that civilization can declare that it is going into decline.  This allows the player to select a new civilization and bring that onto the board while the pawns of the former civilization remain in place, no longer movable but continuing to gather points until their territories are captured.

The game continues until a certain number of points is reached, whereupon the player with the highest score wins.

Reception
Kevin Wilson comments: "Vinci is a tremendous light strategy game that captures the feel of conquering your way across Europe at the head of a marauding band of Gauls without having to deal with the minutiae of where to build your new aqueduct and how many archers to train this turn. It is highly recommended for gamers who enjoy titles such as Civilization, but who simply don't have as much energy or free time as they once had to invest in them."

Reviews
Pyramid

References

External links
 

Board games introduced in 1999
Eurogames (game publisher) games